The 86th District of the Iowa House of Representatives in the state of Iowa.

Current elected officials
Mary Mascher is the representative currently representing the district.

Past representatives
The district has previously been represented by:
 Marion D. Siglin, 1971–1973
 John Clark, 1973–1983
 Gary Sherzan, 1983–1993
 Dick Weidman, 1993–2003
 Cindy Winckler, 2003–2013
 Mary Mascher, 2013–present

References

086